A partial solar eclipse occurred on July 1, 2000. A solar eclipse occurs when the Moon passes between Earth and the Sun, thereby totally or partly obscuring the image of the Sun for a viewer on Earth. A partial solar eclipse occurs in the polar regions of the Earth when the center of the Moon's shadow misses the Earth.
This eclipse occurred near the south pole, and was visible from the southern tip of South America at sunset.

Images

Related eclipses

Eclipses of 2000 
 A total lunar eclipse on January 21.
 A partial solar eclipse on February 5.
 A partial solar eclipse on July 1.
 A total lunar eclipse on July 16.
 A partial solar eclipse on July 31.
 A partial solar eclipse on December 25.

Solar eclipses 2000–2003

Metonic series

References

External links 

2000 7 1
2000 in science
2000 7 1
July 2000 events